Incorporated is an American television science fiction drama series. The show premiered November 30, 2016, on Syfy. Before its official premiere, Syfy released an advance preview of the first episode online on November 16, 2016. The show concluded on January 25, 2017.

On February 27, 2017, the series was cancelled after one season.

Premise
The series takes place in a dystopian Milwaukee in the year 2074, where many countries have gone bankrupt due to a number of crises and climate change. In the absence of effective government, powerful multinational corporations have become de facto governments, controlling areas called Green Zones. The remaining territories are called Red Zones, where governance is weak or non-existent.

Plot

Ben Larson is a manager at Spiga Biotech, the largest corporation in the world. He works for Elizabeth, the estranged mother of his wife, Laura. In reality, he is a climate refugee from the Red Zone outside Milwaukee whose real name is Aaron. Aaron has infiltrated the Green Zone, assuming the identity of Ben Larson to search for his childhood love Elena, who through a series of unfortunate circumstances has become a high-end prostitute at an exclusive brothel for senior Spiga executives. Aaron resolves to work his way up to a senior position in order to access Arcadia and rescue her. After framing his boss Chad for stealing classified information and ensuring his dismissal from the company, Aaron endeavours to obtain the promotion to the now-vacant position and rescue Elena, all while maintaining his Ben Larson cover in the face of increasingly paranoid Spiga security scrutiny and competitive coworkers. He is assisted by Theo, Elena's brother who is still living in the Red Zone, and Reed, another Red Zone denizen who managed to assume a Green Zone persona years before Aaron managed the same feat.

Cast
 Sean Teale as Ben Larson/Aaron Sloane
 Allison Miller as Laura Larson, a cosmetic surgeon and Ben's wife
 Eddie Ramos as Theo Marquez
 Julia Ormond as Elizabeth Krauss, Laura's mother and a high-ranking executive in Spiga
 Dennis Haysbert as Julian, the head of security
 Damon Herriman as Jonathan Hendrick/Henry Reed, a climate refugee hiding in human resources
 Douglas Nyback as Roger Caplan
 Denyse Tontz as Elena Marquez, Theo's sister, Aaron's true love, a prostitute
 Ian Tracey as Terrence
 Mif as Wallace
 David Hewlett as Chad Peterson

Episodes

Notes

DVD release
On June 20, 2017, CBS DVD (distributed by Paramount) released the entire series on DVD in Region 1.

Broadcast 
The series premiered November 30, 2016, on Syfy and in Canada on Showcase.

Production
Georgina Haig played the female lead in the pilot but left and Allison Miller was cast in her place.

Reception
The series has received a 75% rating on Rotten Tomatoes, the site's critical consensus reading: "Incorporated's impressive production values, solid performances, and engaging vision of a bleak future outweigh a predictable, clichéd narrative."

Awards and nominations

References

External links
 Official website
 
 
 

2010s American drama television series
2016 American television series debuts
2017 American television series endings
Climate change in fiction
Dystopian television series
Television shows set in Milwaukee
English-language television shows
Serial drama television series
Syfy original programming
Television series by CBS Studios
2010s American LGBT-related drama television series
Television series by Universal Content Productions